Kimberley is a coastal locality in the Shire of Douglas, Queensland, Australia.

History 
The locality takes its name from Cape Kimberley, which in turn was named on 24 October 1873 after John Wodehouse, First Earl of Kimberley (Secretary of State for the Colonies) by explorer George Elphinstone Dalrymple.

References 

Shire of Douglas
Coastline of Queensland
Localities in Queensland